University of Oregon Press, or UO Press is an American university press that is part of the University of Oregon in Eugene, Oregon.

Since June 1, 2005, books published by UO Press have been distributed by the Oregon State University Press.

Publications

Best Essays Northwest
Best Essays Northwest  (2003) is an anthology of essays featuring a foreword by National Book Award-winner Barry Lopez. The contributions are "drawn from the pages of Oregon Quarterly— the University of Oregon's award-winning magazine — and the annual Oregon Quarterly Northwest Perspectives Essay Contest."

Contents

Northwest Review Book series
Kesey (Book 16)  is  a collection of notes, manuscripts and drawings by Ken Kesey, author of One Flew Over the Cuckoo's Nest. From the University of Oregon Library Special Collections and originally published in 1977, the works were "selected to illustrate the writer's creative process."

An Anthology of Northwest Writing: 1900–1950 (Book 17)  is a collection featuring writings by Woody Guthrie, Mary Barnard and Eva Emery Dye (The Conquest. Originally published in 1979, "Authors and pieces were selected to represent writings typical of the region and time, speak about the history of the region, or simply as enduring, quality prose."

Dialogues With Northwest Writers  (originally published in 1982) features interviews with writers such as Ursula K. Le Guin, Tom Robbins, Lawson Fusao Inada, John Keeble, Richard Hugo, James Welch, Mary Barnard and others about their writings and inspirations.

Warnings: An Anthology on the Nuclear Peril  (originally published in 1984) is a collection of "fiction, poetry, essays, art and an interview discussing implications of the nuclear age. Contributors include Ken Kesey, William Stafford, Patricia Goedicke, Gary Snyder, John Haines, and Robert Morris."

References

External links
"Best Essays NW: Perspectives from Oregon Quarterly" ~ Powell's Books review
Oregon Quarterly website

Oregon
Press
University and college mass media in Oregon
Book publishing companies based in Oregon